Giuseppe Garibaldi (1807–1882) was a revolutionary and a father of modern Italy.

Garibaldi may also refer to:

Places 
 Garibaldi, Rio Grande do Sul, Brazil
 Garibaldi, British Columbia, an abandoned settlement in British Columbia, Canada
 Garibaldi Ranges, a mountain range in British Columbia, Canada
 Mount Garibaldi, British Columbia, Canada
 Garibaldi Névé
 Garibaldi Lake
 Garibaldi Provincial Park
 The Garibaldi, a historic building in Hunters Hill, New South Wales, Australia
 The Garibaldi School, Nottinghamshire, England
 Garibaldi Secondary School, British Columbia, Canada
 Plaza Garibaldi, a plaza in Mexico City, Mexico
 Garibaldi, Oregon, United States
 Porta Garibaldi (disambiguation), a city gate and a district in Milan, Italy

Ships 
 ARA Garibaldi, an armoured cruiser for the Argentine Navy, launched in 1895
 Italian cruiser Giuseppe Garibaldi (1899), sunk in 1915
 Italian cruiser Giuseppe Garibaldi (1936), converted in 1961 into a guided missile cruiser
 Italian aircraft carrier Giuseppe Garibaldi (551)

Transportation
 Milano Porta Garibaldi railway station, a major railway station in Milan, Italy
 Garibaldi (Naples Metro), a station of the Naples Metro
 Garibaldi (Paris Métro), a station of the Paris Métro
 Garibaldi FS (Milan Metro), a station of the Milan Metro
 Garibaldi / Lagunilla metro station, a station of the Mexico City Metro at Plaza Garibaldi
 Garibaldi (Mexico City Metrobús), a BRT station in Mexico City

Other uses 
 Garibaldi (surname), an Italian surname
 Garibaldi (film), a 1961 film by Roberto Rossellini
 Garibaldi (fish), a large orange damselfish
 Garibaldi (group), Mexican pop group
 Garibaldi biscuit
 Associação Garibaldi de Esportes, Brazilian football (soccer) club
 Garibaldi, a cocktail made with Campari
 Garibaldi Lifts Company, a ski resort operation now part of Whistler Blackcomb

See also 
 Garibaldi Ranges
 Garibaldi Volcanic Belt
 Garibaldi Lake volcanic field
 Gariboldi, a surname
 Garybaldi, Italian progressive rock band